Zviad Jeladze (born 16 December 1973) is a retired Georgian footballer.

He is the brother of Gizo Jeladze, his teammate.

Career
Jeladze started his career at Tskhumi Sokhumi before left for Samtredia. He then signed by Dinamo Tbilisi, the country tradition giant. He then left for Russian First Division side Sokol Saratov.

During career at Russia, he also played for First League side except Sodovik Sterlitamak in Russian Second Division.

Jeladze played for Georgia from 1996 to 1998.

References

External links

1973 births
Living people
Sportspeople from Sukhumi
Footballers from Abkhazia
Footballers from Georgia (country)
Expatriate footballers from Georgia (country)
Georgia (country) international footballers
FC Dinamo Tbilisi players
FC Baltika Kaliningrad players
FC Sokol Saratov players
FC Sodovik Sterlitamak players
FC Kristall Smolensk players
FC Lokomotiv Saint Petersburg players
Expatriate footballers in Russia
Expatriate footballers in Kazakhstan
Expatriate sportspeople from Georgia (country) in Russia
Expatriate sportspeople from Georgia (country) in Kazakhstan
Association football defenders